This is a list of simultaneous localization and mapping (SLAM) methods. The KITTI Vision Benchmark Suite website has a more comprehensive list of Visual SLAM methods.

List of methods
 EKF SLAM
 FastSLAM 1.0
 FastSLAM 2.0
 L-SLAM (Matlab code)
 QSLAM
 GraphSLAM
 Occupancy Grid SLAM
 DP-SLAM
 Parallel Tracking and Mapping (PTAM) 
 LSD-SLAM (available as open-source)
 S-PTAM (available as open-source)
 ORB-SLAM (available as open-source)
 ORB-SLAM2 (available as open-source)
 ORB-SLAM3 (available as open-source)
 OrthoSLAM
 MonoSLAM
 GroundSLAM
 CoSLAM
 SeqSlam
 iSAM (Incremental Smoothing and Mapping)
 CT-SLAM (Continuous Time)
 RGB-D SLAM 
 BranoSLAM
 Kimera (open-source)
 Wildcat-SLAM

References

Robot navigation